Danmarks Grimmeste Festival (Denmark's ugliest Festival) is a small music festival, held each summer at a farm in Skjoldhøjkilen, Brabrand; a suburb of Aarhus, Denmark. 

Danmarks Grimmeste Festival features a broad range of genres, including rock, pop, electronic, hip hop and punk music. It is based on volunteers and about 5,000 people attended the 2015 festival. The festival started out as a garden party of four friends at the farm in 2004, and has grown continuously. The 2015 event was the 12th festival and lasted three days from 30 July to 1 August.

References

External links
 Danmarks Grimmeste Festival Official homepage

Music festivals in Denmark
Events in Aarhus
Aarhus V
Summer events in Denmark